Hacoda, also known as Martha, is an unincorporated community in Geneva County, Alabama, United States.

History
The community was first called Martha, in honor of the wife of the first postmaster. The name was later changed to Hacoda in 1904. Hacoda is an acronym created from the surnames of three local businessmen—Hart, Coleman, and Davis. A post office operated under the name Martha from 1882 to 1904, and under the name Hacoda from 1904 to 1956.

References

Unincorporated communities in Geneva County, Alabama
Unincorporated communities in Alabama